Asociația Fotbal Club Progresul Spartac 1944 București, commonly known as Progresul Spartac București or simply as Progresul Spartac, is a Romanian professional football club based in Bucharest and founded in 2014. Currently the team plays in Romania's 2nd Division, Liga II.

The club was founded by a wing of the former club, Progresul București, but does not claim the record, logo or the succession of the old entity, despite the fact that it uses some elements of the original brand (bleu and blue colors; the sycamore leaf), called itself "direct descendant of Progresul București" and its objective is "to revive the spirit of Progresul from Cotroceni".

History

Founded on 16 June 2014 by a wing of the former club, FC Progresul București, Progresul Spartac București is a club that does not claim the record, logo or the succession of the old entity, despite the fact that it uses some elements of the original brand (bleu and blue colors; the sycamore leaf), called itself "direct descendant of Progresul București" and its objective is "to revive the spirit of Progresul from Cotroceni".

In the 2016–17 season, at two years after foundation, the team won Liga IV – Bucharest series and qualified for the promotion play-off where it played against Voința Crevedia, Ilfov County champions. After the first leg, played in Bucharest, the Romanian Football Federation declared forfeit in favor of Voința Crevedia, because Progresul Spartac did not have a doctor at the match. One week later, in the second leg, played this time in Crevedia, Progresul Spartac overturned the situation, winning with 6–2 and gained promotion in the Liga III.

In the first season of Liga III, Progresiștii were the revelation of the second series where after a tough duel against Farul Constanța and even a 7–0 win against them, Progresul had to see itself defeated in the end and finished the season only on the 2nd place. Next season the bleu and blues were again a hard-to-beat team, winning against the big favourite of the series Rapid București and bringing to the stadium located in the "Sparrow's entry" a second division club, Universitatea Cluj, with the occasion of a round of 32 Romanian Cup match.

Ground

With Progresul Spartac Stadium not being eligible for Liga 2 matches, the club announced in August 2022 that the team will play its home matches on CNAF Stadium in Buftea, a stadium with a capacity of 1,600 seats.

Alternatively, Progresul could also play on the Clinceni Stadium, arena that was team's home in its first match of the season, while CNAF Stadium will host the home matches of Concordia Chiajna.

Support
Starting with the 2016–17 season, Progresul Spartac is supported by FC Progresul's former fan groups. Progresul supporters consider FC Argeș Pitești supporters to be their allies, fans of both teams has the opportunity to support the other during matches.

Honours
Liga III
Winners (1): 2021–22
Runners-up (1): 2017–18
Liga IV – Bucharest
Winners (1): 2016–17

Players

First-team squad

Out on loan

Club Officials

Board of directors

Current technical staff

League history

References

External links
 Official website
 

Football clubs in Bucharest
Sport in Bucharest
Association football clubs established in 2014
Liga II clubs
Liga III clubs
Liga IV clubs
2014 establishments in Romania